The Xavier Lopez House is a historic home in St. Augustine, Florida, United States. It is located at 93½ King Street. On July 1, 1993, it was added to the U.S. National Register of Historic Places.

References

Gallery 

Houses on the National Register of Historic Places in Florida
National Register of Historic Places in St. Johns County, Florida
Buildings and structures in St. Augustine, Florida
Houses in St. Johns County, Florida
Houses completed in 1903
Queen Anne architecture in Florida